Nanubhai Vakil (23 May 1902 – 29 December 1980) was a Hindi and Gujarati film director. He was the first to make a Gujarati talkie film with a biopic on the saint Narsinh Mehta in 1932. Narsinh Mehta's (1932) star cast included the actress Mehtab.

Career
Vakil frequently collaborated with Zubeida and Patience Cooper. The twelve-year-old Suraiya, who had done minor roles as a child artist in films like Usne Kya Socha (1937) was cast as the young Mumtaz in Taj Mahal (1941) by Vakil. Vakil later remade several of the silent films "based on Parsi theatre plays".  W. M. Khan, who became famous as the first person to sing in an Indian film, "De De Allah Ke Naam Pe Pyare" in Alam Ara (1931) was made to reprise that song and role when he was seventy-one years old by Nanubhai Vakil. The film was Vakil's version of Alam Ara (1973), produced by Maffatlal Shah, with music by Iqbal Qureshi.

Filmography

As a director

References

External links
 

Gujarati-language film directors
Film directors from Gujarat
Indian male screenwriters
1902 births
1980 deaths
Hindi-language film directors
People from Valsad district
Hindi film producers
20th-century Indian film directors
Indian silent film directors
20th-century Indian screenwriters
20th-century Indian male writers